Patrick Leonard Darcy (born May 12, 1950) is an American former professional baseball player. He played his entire career in Major League Baseball as a right-handed pitcher for the Cincinnati Reds from  through .

Signed as an amateur free agent in 1969 by the Houston Astros, Darcy came to the Cincinnati Reds organization in 1974 when he was exchanged for Denis Menke.

Darcy is best known as the pitcher who gave up Carlton Fisk's walk-off home run in Game 6 of the 1975 World Series. The following season, after recording a 6.23 ERA in 11 appearances with the Reds, Darcy was demoted to the team's Indianapolis Indians farm club in June of that year. Darcy would never again pitch at the major league level.

Darcy was born near Dayton, Ohio. His family relocated to Tucson, Arizona when he was a small child, and he considers Tucson his hometown; Darcy was a standout high school outfielder and pitcher for Rincon High School. Before becoming a professional pitcher, he attended and played for Mesa Community College. Darcy returned to Tucson after his major league career, earning his degree at the University of Arizona, starting his family, becoming active in the real estate industry and various aspects of local civic life. Darcy hosted local sports talk radio programs, ran for mayor of Tucson twice, and drew upon his connections and relationships in Major League Baseball to help bring the Colorado Rockies to Tucson in 1993 as a spring training team. Darcy was inducted into the Pima County (Arizona) Sports Hall of Fame in 1995 and is currently the president of the organization.

References

External links

1950 births
Living people
Major League Baseball pitchers
Cincinnati Reds players
People from Troy, Ohio
Baseball players from Ohio
Mesa Thunderbirds baseball players
Arizona Instructional League Mesa players
Arkansas Travelers players
Columbus Astros players
Covington Astros players
Denver Bears players
Indianapolis Indians players
Iowa Oaks players
New Orleans Pelicans (baseball) players
Oklahoma City 89ers players
Raleigh-Durham Triangles players
St. Petersburg Cardinals players
Williamsport Astros players